Maximus was a Roman usurper (409 – 411) in Hispania (the Iberian Peninsula, modern Spain and Portugal). He had been elected by general Gerontius, who might have been his father.

Relations between the usurper Constantine III and his general Gerontius, who had been sent to Hispania, had been deteriorating through the year 409. When Constantine sent an army under his son and heir Constans, Gerontius mutinied and installed Maximus in the late summer of 410. Kullikowski suggests that Gerontius may have feared being replaced as Constantine's chief military figure in the provinces of Hispania. Drinkwater on the other hand suggests that Gerontius, seeing Constantine negotiating with Emperor Honorius, over 409 had decided to side with the local Theodosian supporters. However, by the summer of 410 Gerontius had received no support from Italy, was threatened by Constans and desperate for imperial authority to confirm his arrangements with his barbarian allies. Faced by these threats, "Gerontius was at length driven into open revolt."

Maximus managed some degree of rule over the provinces of Hispania. Kullikowski reports that "the mint at Barcino struck coins in his name and there is evidence for major construction work on that city's walls during reign."

In the first 18 months of his reign Gerontius's forces defeated Constantine's forces, killed his son Constans at Vienna (modern Vienne, Isère) and trapped Constantine himself inside Arelas. Seeing the losses of the armies of the two usurpers, Honorius sent his general Constantius into Gaul; Gerontius' soldiers deserted him for the imperial general. Gerontius retired to Hispania, and when his remaining troops turned on him, committed suicide.

Deprived of his major supporter, Maximus reportedly fled to sanctuary "amongst the barbarians in Hispania."

The remainder of the recorded history of this shadowy figure becomes even more murky. He is commonly identified with a second Maximus who started his rebellion in Hispania between July 419 and February 421. According to Marcellinus Comes, this Maximus was brought to Rome where he was displayed and executed, along with one Jovinianus, around 23 January 422, during Honorius' tricennalia. Kullikowski supports this identification, explaining that he was defeated and captured by the comes Asterius, for which achievement Asterius was rewarded with the Patriciate.

References

External links

 Elton, Huges, "Maximus (409-422 A.D.)", De Imperatoribus Romanis 
 Coins of Maximus

5th-century Roman usurpers
5th-century deaths
Year of birth unknown